Jordi Sabater Pi (2 August 1922 – 5 August 2009) was a Spanish-Catalan primatologist and worldwide specialist in ethology, the study of animal behavior. Sabater was known for describing the cultural behaviors of several species, including the use of tools by chimpanzees. During the 1960s, he purchased Snowflake, a very rare albino gorilla, and transported him to Barcelona Zoo, where he lived until his death in 2003.

Sabater Pi was born in Barcelona, Catalonia, Spain. He was professor of ethology at the Faculty of Psychology at the University of Barcelona and pioneered the study of animal behaviour and primatology in Spain. His line of work has been continued inside and outside the University of Barcelona by several of his disciples, such as Joaquim J. Veà Baró, Matthew Escobar Aliaga, and Montserrat Colell Mimó.

As a sign of his commitment to chimpanzees, and prompted by the finding of their proximity (both genetically and behavioural) with humans, and the threats hanging over their habitats, Sabater Pi once said that the decline in population and, in the case of some subspecies, their near extinction, was comparable to genocide among human beings. Since the initial years of the 21st century, Sabater Pi took sides in favour of the protection and conservation of primates, supporting projects such as the Proyecto Gran Simio in Spain or Fundación Mona in Girona.

A nature enthusiast, Jordi Sabater Pi was very passionate about his work. One of his pleasures was going out on expeditions to draw; he was known for producing numerous paintings which focused on animals and nature.

See also
 Nonhuman Rights Project
 Jane Goodall
 USC Jane Goodall Research Center
 Washoe (chimpanzee)
 Joaquim Veà Baró

References
Etología de la vivienda humana: de los nidos de gorilas y chimpancés a la vivienda humana. Labor, 1985. .
El chimpancé y los orígenes de la cultura. Barcelona. Anthropos. 1992 (3rd. edition). .
Gorilas y chimpancés del África Occidental. México. Fondo de Cultura Económica. 1993 (2nd. edition).
Okorobikó. A biography of Jordi Sabater Pi from Joan Tort and Pere Tobaruela, Editorial La Magrana  / National Geographic (1st edition, December 2003) 
El traç de la natura. Jordi Sabater Pi y Xavier Duran. Edicions 62, Barcelona, 2001. .
Clark Desmond J.; Veá i Baró, J. J.; Serrallonga Alset, J.; Turbón Borrega, D. (2003), Primates: origin, evolution and behaviour: homage to Jordi Sabater Pi, Edicions Del Parc Científic de Barcelona. .

External links
Special Collection: Jordi Sabater Pi (University of Barcelona Library)
"Dr. Sabater Pi: Dibuix naturalista". Resource Centre for Learning and Research (CRAI), University of Barcelona.
 

1922 births
2009 deaths
Biologists from Catalonia
Primatologists
20th-century Spanish zoologists